The 6th Biathlon European Championships were held in Izhevsk, Russia, from February 1 to February 7, 1999.

8 competitions were held: sprint, individual and relays both for U26 men and women; individual for both junior men and women.

Results

U26

Men's

Women's

Junior

Men's

Women's

Medal table

References

External links 
 IBU full results

Biathlon European Championships
International sports competitions hosted by Russia
1999 in biathlon
1999 in Russian sport
Biathlon competitions in Russia